Nicolaj Siggelkow is an American economist, currently the David M. Knott Professor at Wharton School of the University of Pennsylvania.

Early years 
Siggelkow grew up in Germany before making a move to the United States to pursue his undergraduate degree in economics at Stanford University, where he graduated with distinction and honors in 1993. He then went on to earn a Ph.D. in Economics from Harvard University. After graduating from Harvard in 1998, Siggelkow joined Wharton School of the University of Pennsylvania as faculty.

References

External links
 Website

Year of birth missing (living people)
Living people
 Wharton School of the University of Pennsylvania faculty
American economists
Stanford University alumni
Harvard University alumni